Bunjevac may refer to:

 Bunjevac dialect
 Bunjevci

See also
 
 Bunčevac